This is a list of NUTS2 statistical regions of Norway by the Human Development Index, as of 2021.

See also
 List of countries by Human Development Index
 List of countries by inequality-adjusted Human Development Index
 List of countries by planetary pressures–adjusted Human Development Index

References 

Regions by Human Development Index
Norway
Norway